MacGyver is an American action-adventure television series created by Lee David Zlotoff and Henry Winkler. The show ran for seven seasons on ABC in the United States and various other networks abroad from 1985 to 1992.

The pilot episode was first aired in the US on September 29, 1985. The show's final episode aired on April 25, 1992 on ABC (the network aired a previously unseen episode for the first time on May 21, 1992, but it was originally intended to air before the series finale). Two television movies, MacGyver: Lost Treasure of Atlantis and MacGyver: Trail to Doomsday, aired on ABC in 1994.

Series overview

Episodes

Season 1 (1985–86)

Season 2 (1986–87)

Season 3 (1987–88)

Season 4 (1988–89)

Season 5 (1989–90)

Season 6 (1990–91)

Season 7 (1991–92)

TV films (1994)

References

External links 
 
 

Episodes
Lists of American action television series episodes

zh:百戰天龍#劇集列表